The Faith Towards Hockey Award is awarded annually to the Kontinental Hockey League player who best exemplifies the qualities of perseverance, sportsmanship, and dedication to ice hockey. The award held by «Sozvezdie» fund and Russian Sportsmans' Union in 2000.

Winners

References

Kontinental Hockey League trophies and awards